Nikolay Milkov (born 10 December 1957 in Sofia, Bulgaria) is a Bulgarian diplomat and politician. He is currently serving as the Minister of Foreign Affairs since 18 August 2022 in Bulgaria. Prior to his appointment he was previously the Bulgarian Ambassador to France. He had also served as the Ambassador to Canada and Romania.

References 

Living people
1957 births
People from Sofia
Foreign ministers of Bulgaria
Bulgarian politicians
21st-century Bulgarian politicians